Avocats Sans Frontières (ASF), also known as Advocaten Zonder Grenzen or Lawyers without Borders, is an international NGO, active in the human rights and development sector. Created in 1992 by a group of Belgian lawyers, ASF’s main objective is the realisation of institutions and mechanisms that facilitate access to independent and fair justice systems that ensure legal security and guarantee fundamental human rights for everyone.

History

The ambition of the first Lawyers Without Frontiers in 1992 was to lend assistance and/or to defend persons whose rights were not respected in their country, because the cases were ‘sensitive’. Between 1992 and 1996 countless missions for immediate assistance were realised. As part of the project ‘Solidarity and Defence’ (later renamed ‘Lawyer for Lawyer’), lawyers were sent abroad for several weeks to give assistance and/or intervene in sensitive cases.

In 1994 the genocide in Rwanda caused commotion within the international community. Even though ASF was not yet equipped for long-term interventions, it decided to take action anyway. Between 1995 and 1998 different trainings were realised in Arusha, Tanzania, to educate lawyers on the proceedings of the International Criminal Tribunal for Rwanda.

Furthermore, there was the problem of a gross lack of lawyers in the country. During the genocide many people died, while others fled. The remaining lawyers could not or did not want to be involved in trials to convict the perpetrators. To answer this problem ASF started the program ‘Rights for Everyone in Rwanda’. To realise this program, ASF opened its first permanent mission abroad in Rwanda.

The necessity to execute a long-term detailed project facilitates ASF’s growth into an international organisation. Besides the initial mission for direct assistance and defence of people, ASF sets itself another goal: to contribute, as an independent actor, to a more just and equitable society, in which the law serves the most vulnerable people.

In this respect, ASF opens new missions in Burundi (1999), Kosovo (2000), the Democratic Republic of Congo (2000), Timor-Leste (2000), Uganda (2007), and Nepal (2010).

Goal

Avocats Sans Frontières (ASF), also known as Advocaten Zonder Grenzen (AdZG) is an international non-governmental organization contributing to the creation of fair and equitable societies, in which the law and its institutions serve the most vulnerable groups and individuals. ASF aims to realise this objective through field interventions in the areas of access to justice, legal aid and legal assistance before both national and international jurisdictions, such as the International Criminal Court.

ASF uses the law to serve the most vulnerable people: e.g. minors, women, persons illegally imprisoned, victims of human rights violationsm and any individual or group unable to access justice.

ASF currently has field offices in Burundi, the Democratic Republic of the Congo, Rwanda, Morocco, Indonesia, Central African Republic, Uganda, Chad and Tunisia. The organisation also works on thematic issues such as access to justice, defending the 'defenders', international criminal justice, strategic litigation, and economic and social rights.

In the countries of intervention, ASF teams work in close collaboration with local partners (lawyers, bar associations and civil society organisations). The legal professionals in the International Legal Network (ILN) support ASF missions on ad hoc basis.

Activities

Access to Justice
Where the legal aid system is inadequate or absent, the most vulnerable populations have limited access to courts and other mechanisms used for resolving disputes. Their right to fair and equitable justice is at risk.

Together with local partners, ASF develops and establishes mechanisms, tailored to the local situation, improving access to justice for the most vulnerable populations. We organize awareness campaigns amongst the local population to improve knowledge on their rights. Our legal aid centres offer free legal information, advice and referrals. ASF lawyers are available to help the most vulnerable. If needed, mobile courts are organised to ensure access to justice in remote and rural areas.

Finally, ASF strengthens the capacity of local NGOs and bar associations by providing structural support and regular training.

Defending the "defenders"
ASF intervenes in cases where lawyers and human rights defenders are threatened, criminalised, harassed or even killed. ASF intervenes in these cases by providing legal and/or material aid to the victim, or serves as an observer at their trial.

ASF also supports local bar associations and human rights organisations through capacity building and advocacy.

Supporting international justice
An international justice system assures the protection of human rights and supports the restoration of victims’ dignity. ASF assists victims who wish to be represented before national and international courts that prosecute international crimes. In this context, ASF provides assistance to victims in several court cases pending before the International Criminal Court (ICC) in The Hague.

Strategic litigation
ASF is active in strategic litigation. Intervening in a specific case not only contributes to ending injustice for the involved parties, but can also serve – by changing the law – greater public interest.

ASF intervenes for the benefit of vulnerable people in emblematic cases through negotiation, mediation and/or taking a case to court for groups such as child soldiers, victims of human trafficking, torture or mistreatment, threatened journalists, etc.

Economic and social rights
Economic and social rights, such as the rights to decent work conditions, the highest attainable standard of health, education, adequate standard of living including access to land, food and water, are typically violated as a result of lack of political will, negligence and/or discrimination. 
 
ASF provides legal assistance to vulnerable communities  to ensure that they have equal access to legal mechanisms in their interactions with more powerful actors (State and non-State), to ensure that people know their rights and are empowered to use them. ASF works with communities to encourage legislative reform through advocacy and, if need be, strategic litigation.

International Legal Network
Created by Avocats Sans Frontières (ASF) in 2010, the ILN brings together legal professionals from around the world eager to share their expertise and participate in activities to ensure that the law is a driving force for sustainable change.

Members of the ILN take part in ASF interventions in countries where justice is inaccessible or where there are few security guarantees for vulnerable populations. They contribute to developing mechanisms and actions for strengthening judicial stakeholders and improving access to justice.

With a strong emphasis on solidarity, members of the ILN perform their missions in accordance with pro bono conditions: voluntary work, constantly ensuring quality of services that benefit the most vulnerable people. The ILN offers a lasting partnership for law firms and other legal professionals wishing to develop their pro bono activities.

Awards
In 2007, ASF was granted the CCBE Human Rights Award by the Council of Bars and Law Societies of Europe.

In 2009, ASF won the Law and Sustainability Prize of the Association of Flemish Jurists.

Misc
Avocats Sans Frontières has no affiliation with "Lawyers Without Borders". Its Dutch name is "Advocaten Zonder Grenzen"; the organization does not carry an English name. Avocats Sans Frontières is also commonly known by its abbreviation "ASF".

See also

 Human rights
 Legal aid
 Rule of law
 International Criminal Court

References

External links
 Avocats Sans Frontières Official Website in English, French and Dutch
Download ASF general flyer
 ASF Canada
Official press release of The Council of Bars and Law Societies of Europe (CCBE)announcing that the CCBE Human Rights Award is granted to Avocats Sans Frontières
 ASF publication that won the Solidarity Prize (Solidariteitspreis) of the newspaper De Standaard

Human rights organisations based in Belgium
International human rights organizations
International criminal law
Organisations based in Brussels
International law organizations
Organizations established in 1992
1992 establishments in Belgium